is a Japanese drama film directed by Yōichirō Takahashi. Originally broadcast in 1999 as an NHK Hi-Vision drama, it was screened in the Un Certain Regard section at the 2000 Cannes Film Festival. It was screened theatrically in October 2005 after the sudden death of lead actress, Yumika Hayashi, in June of that year.

Cast
 Yumika Hayashi
 Liliy
 Kenji Mizuhashi
 Shinya Tsukamoto
 Tetsu Watanabe
 Yumi Yoshiyuki

References

External links

 
 

2000 films
2000s Japanese-language films
2000 drama films
Films directed by Yoichiro Takahashi
2000s Japanese films